Butter Brickle is a chocolate-coated toffee first sold 20 November 1924 by candy manufacturer John G. Woodward Co. of Council Bluffs, Iowa, and toffee pieces for flavoring ice cream, manufactured by The Fenn Bros. Ice Cream and Candy Co. of Sioux Falls, South Dakota.

John G. Woodward & Co.
Butter Brickle was first sold on 20 November 1924, and the trademark registered 15 May 1928 by candy manufacturer John G. Woodward Co. in Council Bluffs, Iowa for candy, not ice cream.

Arthur E. Dempsey, a candy maker and later, inventor, at John G. Woodward Co. in Council Bluffs, Iowa, reportedly, was the creator of the candy, trademarked as Butter Brickle

Fenn Bros. Ice Cream and Candy Co. 

Fenn Bros. Ice Cream and Candy Co., founded in 1898, by Henry C. Fenn and James W. Fenn, is most known for its registered trademark chocolate-coated toffee, and toffee ice cream flavoring called Butter Brickle. The products were called Fenn's Butter Brickle English Toffee Chocolate Covered and Fenn's Butter Brickle Candy Ice Cream Flavoring.

Omaha, Nebraska's Blackstone Hotel's Orleans Room restaurant has been credited with creating Butter Brickle ice cream,  in the late 1920s. Small pieces of the toffee candy bar were used, in effect, to make a mix-in, later sold as the product, Fenn's Butter Brickle Candy Ice Cream Flavoring.

Besides Butter Brickle, the company also made Walnut Crush, Blue Seal Nougat, Smooth Sailin’, Royal Brazils, and Big Bogie (later Big Nougat), and ice cream.

The first sponsored musical program on KSOO Radio was sponsored by Fenn's Blue Seal Nougat Bar.

The United States Food and Drug Administration cited them in 1940 for labeling and in 1947 for filthy product.

In the late 1950s and 1960s, Butter Brickle candy bars were advertised on radio and television with the slogan "Got a nickel? Butter Brickle,... candy bar!" delivered in an arch stage British accent.

At the company’s peak, more than 200 people worked at Fenn’s, making it one of Sioux Falls' largest employers.

"I'd work on the beater, but most times I had to cool cooked nougat," she says. It was used in one of Fenn's most popular offerings, the Walnut Crush. Walnuts were added to the nougat, and then it was coated with chocolate. Another specialty, the Big Bogie, came in three flavors, vanilla, chocolate and strawberry. It is kin to a candy called Charleston Chew. "Bill Fenn came up one time with that candy bar and said, "Can you guys make this bar?" and I said, "Oh, I think we can," " John says. The production of stick candy halted during WWII. When sugar was rationed by the government, the company devoted its efforts to the growing popularity of its candy bars. Even those didn't stay the same. Over the years, the Wiemans saw candy bars come and go and the price jump from a nickel to a dime. Lily liked the Blue Seal Nougat. Similar to a Walnut Crush, it had vanilla flavoring in the nougat, not maple syrup, and was coated with sweet chocolate, not dark chocolate. They both wrinkle their noses at the thought of a candy bar that was made with white chocolate - "imitation white chocolate," Lily points out with disdain."

The Fenn Bros. manufactured Butter Brickle candy and flavoring until the 1970s, when the company liquidated. The "Butter Brickle"  trademark and formula were sold to the company Leaf, Inc., which manufactured Heath Bars.

A remnant of the name remains in "Heath Bits 'o Brickle Toffee Bits," sold by The Hershey Company, which acquired the Heath assets in 1996.

Butter Brickle flavor ice cream is currently sold by ice-cream makers, the name Butter Brickle used under license.

In popular culture

In the T.V. show Two and a Half Men, Rose requests Charlie to bring her some Butter Brickle ice cream.

See also
 List of ice cream flavors
 nonpareils
 sprinkles
 Steve's Ice Cream
 Amy's Ice Creams
 Cold Stone Creamery

References

External links 
 Fenn's (trademark)
 Fenn's Butter Brickle English Toffee Chocolate Covered (trademark)
 "Anderson displays some of the memorabilia from his father's days working at Fenn Bros"  Argus Leader, Sioux Falls, South Dakota, Wednesday, June 18, 2014; Page C1

External images 
 Fenn's Butter Brickle 10-cent candy bar wrapper - 1970's flickr
 Fenn's Butter Brickle Candy Ice Cream Flavoring (Can) 12.75 inch tall 9.75 inch diameter eBay via archive.org
 Fenn's Butter Brickle and Walnut Crush Candy Bar Boxes eBay via archive.org
 Big Bogie Candy Bar Wrapper (Circa 1940) eBay via archive.org
 

Flavors of ice cream
Products introduced in 1924